PMG may refer to:

 PmG (German: , "passenger train with goods service")
 Pacita MG railway station, in San Pedro, Laguna, Philippines
 Pamplin Media Group, US
 Peace Monitoring Group, in Papua New Guinea
 Peace Myanmar Group, a Burmese beverage company
 People Make Games, a journalistic YouTube channel
 Phonomyography
 Poetae Melici Graeci
 Polymicrogyria
 Ponta Porã International Airport, Brazil
 Postmaster General (disambiguation)
 Postmaster-General's Department, in Australia
 Professional Management Group, an Indian sports management company